The 287th Sustainment Brigade was a sustainment brigade of the Kansas Army National Guard. The Brigade was activated on 1 September 2005, and is headquartered in Wichita. Its mission was to plan, prepare, execute and assess combat service support operations within a corps or division Area of Operations. It was the largest brigade-level headquarters in the state. In 2015, it was announced that the brigade would be deactivating in FY2016. The brigade was deactivated on 1 May 2016.

Units included:
HHC 287th
287th Special Troops Battalion
891st Engineer Battalion
169th Corps Support Sustainment Battalion (CSSB)

History 
The brigade deployed to Iraq between 2008 and 2009, where it provided logistical support for Coalition troops.

References

Adjutant General's Department News Article
The Institute of Heraldry: 287th Sustainment brigade

287
Military units and formations established in 2005
Military units and formations disestablished in 2016